I Escaped from Devil's Island is a 1973 exploitation film about an escape attempt from Devil's Island. Roger Corman and Gene Corman produced this grim adventure saga which was made to cash in on the release of Papillon.

Plot summary

Prison life on Devil's Island is no picnic so fellow prisoners Le Bras (Jim Brown) and Davert (Christopher George) escape. Along their escape route, they encounter submissive native women and a colony of lepers.

Cast
 Jim Brown as Le Bras
 Christopher George as Davert (as Chris George)
 Richard Ely as Joe "Jo-Jo" (as Rick Ely)
 James Luisi as Dazzas
 Paul Richards as Major Marteau
 Richard Rust as Sergeant Zamorra
 Bob Harris as The Barber (as Roland 'Bob' Harris)
 Jan Merlin as Rosenquist
 Robert Phillips as Blassier
 Stephen Whittaker as Leper Count
 Eduardo Rosas López as Sergeant Brescano
 Jonathan Dodge as Lieutenant Duplis
 Quintín Bulnes as Sergeant Grizzoni
 Gabriella Rios as Indian Girl
 Ana De Sade as Bedalia

Production
Jim Brown was signed to make the film in December 1972.

Martin Scorsese says that Roger Corman offered him the chance to direct the film following Boxcar Bertha. "The idea was if you shoot it fast enough, you could release the film before Papillon," he said. "I was still very keen on genre films." However Scorsese decided to make Mean Streets instead. He says he had been talked out of doing exploitation films by his friend and colleague John Cassavetes who urged Scorsese to make something more personal. (Corman also offered Scorsese The Arena and the director turned that down as well.)

William Witney directed instead. Filming started in April 1973 in Acapulco. During filming, Witney's wife died of throat cancer.

The producers of the similar film Papillon (1973) sued for copyright infringement but were unsuccessful.

Reception
Quentin Tarantino was an admirer of the film with a script that is "both entertaining and rather complex" and lead characters that "are refreshingly complicated and three dimensional" and a fresh "exploration of the societal dynamics of the community that the island prisoners exist in" in particular The Fancy Boys who "aren’t presented the way the queer population is usually depicted in novels about Alcatraz or other prison-set seventies adventures... [they] hold their own respected status inside of the island convict community without degradation. They’re respected both as individuals and as the group they represent. And are coveted objects of desire among the convict population."

Video Release
Shout Factory is releasing I Escaped from Devil's Island on DVD and Blu-ray on July 15, 2014.

See also
 List of American films of 1973

References

External links
 
 
 
Review of film at Joe Dante

1973 films
1970s action films
American action films
1970s exploitation films
Films directed by William Witney
Films produced by Gene Corman
Films scored by Les Baxter
Films set in 1916
Films set on Devil's Island
United Artists films
1970s prison films
Films produced by Roger Corman
1970s English-language films
1970s American films
English-language action films